The 1554 siege of Kannomine was one of many battles fought in Takeda Shingen's campaign to seize control of Shinano Province. This took place during Japan's Sengoku period; Shingen was one of many feudal lords (daimyōs) who battled to gain land and power.

Kannomine was located in the Ina valley in Japan's Shinano province; it was commanded by Yoritomo Chiku, and was taken just prior to the sieges of Matsuo and Yoshioka.

References
Turnbull, Stephen (1998). The Samurai Sourcebook. London: Cassell & Co.

Kannomine
Kannomine
1554 in Japan
Conflicts in 1554